The Royal Zoological Society of New South Wales (RZSNSW) was formed in Sydney, New South Wales, Australia in 1879 as the New South Wales Zoological Society.  A Royal Charter was granted in September, 1908, leading to a change to the current name on 10 February 1909.  It publishes the scientific journal 

In 1979 the Society established the annually presented Whitley Awards, the peak awards for excellence in zoological publishing relating to the fauna of the Australasian region.

Fellowships
Fellows of the Royal Zoological Society of NSW have been appointed since the earliest days of the RZS in recognition of scientists who have made outstanding contributions to zoological life in Australia, either through their research or their work in promoting the aims and objective of the RZS. They are appointed only on nomination by the Council of the Royal Zoological Society of NSW and entitled to the use of the post-nominal title FRZS. As of 2015 the society had 1127 members and had elected 85 fellows since it was created.

Publication

References

External links
 Royal Zoological Society of New South Wales

Further reading
 

Zoological societies
Scientific organisations based in Australia
Organisations based in Australia with royal patronage
1879 establishments in Australia
Clubs and societies in Australia